Thomas Pedrabissi (born 1 June 1995) is an Italian footballer who plays as a forward for U.S. Sestese Calcio.

Club career

Internazionale
Born in Como, Lombardy, Pedrabissi was a player for Lombard club F.C. Internazionale Milano from 2006 to 2013. He was a player for the under-12 team in "Esordienti" league, to under-18–19 "Primavera" reserve league in 2013. In January 2012 half of the registration rights of Pedrabissi was sold to fellow Serie A club A.C. Cesena (50% "card" tagged for €1 million) in exchange for Marko Livaja (50% "card" tagged for €2.25 million), who unable to sign by Inter directly, plus €1.25 million cash. While Cesena retained 50% registration rights of Livaja as gift with obligation to pay Livaja's former club – Hajduk Split €250,000. Pedrabissi signed a -year contract, which later extended to  after Pedrabissi made his professional debut. Pedrabissi remained in Inter in temporary deal for the rest of the season. In June 2012 the co-ownership deals were renewed. Pedrabissi remained in Inter youth system until June 2013, which Inter acquired Luca Caldirola (50% "card" tagged for €2.5 million) for €500,000 cash plus 50% registration rights of Pedrabissi (50% "card" tagged for €1 million), Del Piero (50% "card" tagged for €250,000) and Melgrati (50% "card" tagged for €750,000), which Caldirola was re-sold to Werder Bremen for €2.5 million, which in turn made 50% card of Del Piero, Melgrati plus Pedrabissi worth €750,000 in total in cash.

Cesena
Pedrabissi received call-up from Cesena's reserve on 17 July 2013, while his former Inter team-mate Garritano went to the first team. Since November 2013 Pedrabissi also received first team call-up, On 8 March 2014 Pedrabissi made his first team debut as a substitute of Marilungo in Serie B. Pedrabissi and Garritano (who also a sub) did not score any goal for Cesena.

Circa summer 2015 Cesena released Pedrabissi and Del Piero for free (one year earlier than their original contracts). The club also registered an accounting loss of €611,111, the residual accounting value of the players.

Switzerland
In summer 2015 he moved to Switzerland for an amateur club based in Torricella-Taverne.

Pergolettese
On 19 June 2016 Pedrabissi was signed by Pergolettese.

International career
Pedrabissi scored 3 goals in 2012 UEFA European Under-17 Championship qualification. However Pedrabissi did not go to the elite qualification round.

References

External links
 Lega Serie B profile 
 

Italian footballers
A.C. Cesena players
Santarcangelo Calcio players
U.S. Pergolettese 1932 players
S.S.D. Varese Calcio players
A.S.D. Sorrento players
S.S. Verbania Calcio players
Serie B players
Serie C players
Serie D players
Association football forwards
Italy youth international footballers
Sportspeople from Como
1995 births
Living people
Footballers from Lombardy